The Korean Amateur Radio League (KARL) (Korean, 한국아마추어무선연맹) is a non-profit organization for amateur radio enthusiasts in South Korea.   KARL was founded in 1955 by Korean radio communication enthusiasts.  Due to advocacy efforts of KARL, the first amateur radio station in South Korea, HL2AA is Seoul, was licensed in 1959.  KARL is the national member society representing South Korea in the International Amateur Radio Union.  KARL was the host society for the 14th World Amateur Radio Direction Finding Championships held in Hwaseong, Gyeonggi, South Korea in September, 2008.

See also 
International Amateur Radio Union

References 

South Korea
Clubs and societies in South Korea
Organizations established in 1955
1955 establishments in South Korea
Organizations based in Seoul
South Korean radio